Beşdəli (also, Beshdali, Yakha-Bashtali, and Yakha-Beshtali) is a village and municipality in the Sabirabad Rayon of Azerbaijan.  It has a population of 427.

References 

Populated places in Sabirabad District